A by-election was held for the New South Wales Legislative Assembly electorate of Mudgee on 16 August 1911 because of the resignation of Labor Party member Bill Dunn because he disagreed with legislation introduced by the Labor Secretary for Lands Niels Nielsen. Labor reversed its policy and Dunn stood for re-election as the Labor candidate.

Dates

Results

Bill Dunn resigned in protest over land legislation.

See also
Electoral results for the district of Mudgee
List of New South Wales state by-elections

Notes

References

1911 elections in Australia
New South Wales state by-elections
1910s in New South Wales